Robyn Carr is an American author. She is the writer of the Virgin River series of books and has written more than fifty novels. Her novels have been on The New York Times Best Seller list, including titles such as The Hero.

She is also an executive producer on the television adaptation of Virgin River.

Biography
Carr studied nursing in college.  She married her high school sweetheart just before he left for the US Air Force as a helicopter pilot during the Vietnam War.  Carr followed her new husband from base to base, and because they did not stay in any one place for very long, she was unable to pursue her nursing career.  When a difficult pregnancy required her to be off of her feet, Carr turned to romance novels to distract herself.  She soon decided to write her own novels.

Carr has since published dozens of historical and contemporary romance novels, a suspense novel, a non-fiction work, short stories, articles, and even wrote several screenplays which have yet to be sold.  Carr also hosts monthly "Carr Chats" at the Paseo Verde Library in Henderson, Nevada where she interviews other authors.

Carr has a son and a daughter.

Bibliography

Stand-alone novels
Chelynne (1980)
Blue Falcon (1981)
Bellerose Bar (1982)
Braeswood Tapestry (1985)
The Troubadour's Romance (1985)
By Right of Arms (1986)
The Bellerose Bargain (1986)
The Everlasting Covenant (1987)
Tempted (1987)
Rogue's Lady (1988)
Informed Risk (1989)
Woman's Own (1990)
The Armstrong Women (1990)
Mind Tryst (1992)
The House on Olive Street (2000)
The Wedding Party (2002)
Blue Skies (2004)
Runaway Mistress (2005)
Never Too Late (2006)
Four Friends (2014)
Swept Away (2016) [Originally Published as 'Runaway Mistress']
The Life She Wants (2016)
The Summer That Made Us (2017)
A Summer in Sonoma (2018)
The Garden Party (2019)
The View from Alameda Island (April 30, 2019)
A Family Affair (2022)

Grace Valley
Deep in the Valley (2001)
Just Over the Mountain (2002)
Down by the River (2003)

Virgin River
Virgin River (2007)
Shelter Mountain (2007)
Whispering Rock (2007)
A Virgin River Christmas (2008)
Second Chance Pass (2009)
Temptation Ridge (2009)
Paradise Valley (2009)
Under the Christmas Tree (In the anthology That Holiday Feeling) (2009)
Forbidden Falls (2010)
Angel's Peak (2010)
Moonlight Road (2010)
Sheltering Hearts (2010) [A Virgin River novella]
Midnight Confessions (In the anthology Midnight Kiss) (2010)
Promise Canyon (2011)
Wild Man Creek (2011)
Harvest Moon (2011)
Bring Me Home for Christmas (2011)
Hidden Summit (2012)
Redwood Bend (2012)
Sunrise Point (2012)
My Kind of Christmas (2012)
Return to Virgin River (2020)

Thunder Point
The Wanderer (2013)
The Newcomer (2013)
The Hero (2013)
The Chance (2014)
The Promise (2014)
The Homecoming (2014)
One Wish (2015)
A New Hope (2015)
Wildest Dreams (2015)

Sullivan's Crossing
What We Find (2016)
Any Day Now (2017)
The Family Gathering (2018)
The Best of Us (January 8, 2019)
The Country Guesthouse (2020)

Omnibus
To Mother with Love: Way Home / Backward Glance / So This Is Love (1993) (with Linda Howard and Cheryl Reavis)
That Holiday Feeling: Silver Bells / The Perfect Holiday / Under the Christmas Tree (2009) (with Debbie Macomber and Sherryl Woods)
Midnight Kiss: Midnight Confessions / Midnight Surrender / Midnight Assignment (2010) (with Jean Brashear and Victoria Dahl)
'Tis the Season: Under the Christmas Tree / Midnight Confessions (2014)
Home to You: Virgin River / When Lightning Strikes (2017) (with Brenda Novak)
All I Want for Christmas: A Virgin River Christmas / Under the Christmas Tree (2018)

Non fiction
Practical Tips for Writing Popular Fiction (1993)

Anthologies containing stories by Robyn Carr
David Copperfield's Beyond Imagination (1996)

Short stories
"Natasha's Bedroom" (1996)

References

External links
Robyn Carr official website

20th-century American novelists
21st-century American novelists
American romantic fiction writers
American women novelists
Living people
Year of birth missing (living people)
20th-century American women writers
21st-century American women writers
20th-century American short story writers
21st-century American short story writers
Place of birth missing (living people)
Women romantic fiction writers